The Frontline Socialist Party is a communist party in Sri Lanka. It was launched on 9 April 2012 by dissident members of the Janatha Vimukthi Peramuna.

The Frontline Socialist Party (FLSP) was launched at the First Convention held on 9 April 2012 by the dissident group of Janatha Vimukthi Peramuna (JVP). The stalwarts of the party claimed that they are in an attempt to the revival of socialist struggle in Sri Lanka. The organizing secteray of the party is Premakumar Gunaratnam

Electoral history

Cause for the Split from the JVP
FLSP claims that the Janatha Vimukthi Peramuna has lost its revolutionary thought built by Rohana Wijeweera since the beginning of his campaign. They claim that the JVP now relies on government coalitions rather than Revolutionary Socialism.

Premakumar Gunaratnam was the Trincomalee leader of the Deshapremi Janatha Viyaparaya and worked as a secondary revolutionary leader of the JVP. He was at the odds of the party for the lack of the revolutionary purpose since Wijeweera's death in 1989.

April 2012, internal crisis within the party heated up between the hard core socialist Gunaratnam and the party leader Somawansa Amarasinghe. As a result, the party’s media unit was shut down once a majority of the members extended their support to Gunarathnam. The Women’s wing 
 and a majority of the Student's wing and the Youth wing have extended their support to Gunaratnam group.

2020 Protests

The members of the party with some other left-wing parties held protests in front of the US embassy in Sri Lanka which was later assaulted by Police officers complaining about the breaking of "health regulations". 

The party members claimed this was a peaceful protest against the murder of George Floyd and against the signing of MCC deal with the United States.

The members of the FLSP, Premakumar Gunaratnam and a group of supporters of the FLSP started marching down the streets mostly wearing Red to represent Communism and Anti-racism. The members carried posters that read "Racism is a deadly virus" thus referring to the outbreak of the Coronavirus. The police soon crossed the road blocking the road to the U.S Embassy. The police then began to clash with the protesters. No deaths were caused in the combat but may were wounded by the end.

Arrests
FLSP secretary Kumar Guneratnam and some other key members were arrested and some other were hospitalized after getting attacked. Two lawyers who questioned the police about the reason for arrest also were taken into the custody.

References

2012 establishments in Sri Lanka
Anti-imperialist organizations
Communist parties in Sri Lanka
Political parties established in 2012